Hardin-Jefferson Independent School District is a public school district based in Sour Lake, Texas (USA). The district covers south central Hardin and northwestern Jefferson counties.

In addition to Sour Lake, the district serves the cities of China, Nome, and Bevil Oaks, as well as the unincorporated community of Pinewood Estates.

Hardin-Jefferson won the 2007 Boys Basketball State Championship, beating Abilene Wylie 56 to 44.

In 2009, the school district was rated "recognized" by the Texas Education Agency.

Schools
Hardin-Jefferson High (Grades 9-12)
The high school campus, newly built for the '09-'10 school year, sits along Texas State Highway 326 next to its predecessor, now Henderson Middle School.
Henderson Middle (Grades 6-8)
Previously located in China where China Elementary now stands, the district relocated the middle school staff and students to the old high school campus in 2009.
Sour Lake Elementary (Grades PK-5)
Serving, largely, that of the district that lies in Hardin County (as well as some Nome residents), the campus sits along Highway 326 south of Sour Lake.
China Elementary (Grades PK-5)
Previously located in the center of China, the district instead allocated the old middle school campus (with considerable renovations) for use as the new elementary.

Notable alumni
 Ben Broussard – Major League Baseball first baseman
 David Joel – Texas Country musician

References

External links
Hardin-Jefferson ISD

School districts in Hardin County, Texas
School districts in Jefferson County, Texas